George Read, within the politics of Canada, is the former leader of the Alberta Greens and formerly a key organizer for the federal Green Party of Canada (GPC) in Alberta.

Green Party organizing 

Read led the provincial and federal Green Parties in Alberta during a period (what period) of growth in support for the parties. Prior to his involvement, the Green Party remained well below 1% of the vote in Alberta. (Source needed)

Alberta Greens

Read was elected leader of the Alberta Greens at the provincial convention held in Red Deer on November 1, 2003.  Read won the position against incumbent David Parker.

Green Party of Canada
Read brought together organizers for the Green Party of Canada who recruited the first full slate of Green candidates in Alberta for the 2004 federal election.

In that election, the Green Party of Canada received a higher percentage of votes in Alberta than in other provinces: the party won 6.3% of the popular vote in the province, and approximately 10% in the ridings of Calgary Centre-North (third highest Green vote percentage in Canada) and Calgary South Centre (fourth highest in Canada). Some commentators ascribed this to the relatively weak position of the Liberal Party of Canada and New Democratic Party in Alberta.

Read was the National campaign manager of the Green Party of Canada for the 2006 Federal election.

Read participated in a committee to decide staff changes in the GPC as of November 2006. One of the positions it would decide would be the National Campaign Manager.

Election campaigns 

In June 2004, he ran for election as the Green Party of Canada candidate in the federal riding of Calgary Southeast, finishing just behind the NDP candidate.

He ran for the provincial Greens in the Calgary-Egmont riding in the 2004 Alberta provincial election. Finishing just behind the Alberta Alliance and ahead of the NDP.

He was the Alberta Greens candidate in the June 12, 2007, by-election for the riding of Calgary Elbow.

Read was the leader of the Alberta Greens in the Mar 3rd 2008 provincial election. He ran in the riding of Calgary Northwest and received 4.95% of the vote. The Alberta Greens moved from 2.8% of the vote in 2004 to 4.6% of the vote in 2008 under Reads Leadership.

The Alberta Greens ran 79 candidates in 2008 up from 49 candidates in 2004.

Partial electoral history

Personal history 

Read was born and raised Feb 29, 1972 in Calgary, Alberta, Canada.

As a youth, he was a member of Scouts Canada, which he credits with giving him a love of the outdoors.

He graduated with a Bachelor of Arts in Political Science/Management from the University of Calgary.

He has also been active for many years with the Sierra Club of Canada, in Calgary.

See also 
List of Green party leaders in Canada

References

External links

 Alberta Greens website

Alberta Greens candidates in Alberta provincial elections
Politicians from Calgary
Living people
Year of birth missing (living people)
Leaders of the Alberta Greens